The fourth round of the women's individual pursuit of the 2007–08 UCI Track Cycling World Cup Classics took place in Copenhagen, Denmark on 15 February 2008. 23 athletes participated in the contest.

Competition format
The women's individual pursuit consists of a 3 km time trial race between two riders, starting on opposite sides of the track. If one rider catches the other, the race is over.

The tournament consisted of an initial qualifying round.  The top two riders in the qualifying round advanced to the gold medal match and the third and fourth riders advanced to the bronze medal race.

Schedule
Friday 15 February
11:10-12:20 Qualifying
18:40-18:55 Finals
19:55:-20:00 Victory Ceremony

Schedule from Tissottiming.com

Results

Qualifying

Results from Tissottiming.com.

Finals

Final bronze medal race

Results from Tissottiming.com.

Final gold medal race

Results from Tissottiming.com.

World Cup Standings
Final standings after 4 of 4 2007–08 World Cup races.

Results from Tissottiming.com.

See also
 2007–08 UCI Track Cycling World Cup Classics – Round 4 – Women's points race
 2007–08 UCI Track Cycling World Cup Classics – Round 4 – Women's scratch
 2007–08 UCI Track Cycling World Cup Classics – Round 4 – Women's team pursuit
 UCI Track Cycling World Cup Classics – Women's individual pursuit

References

2007–08 UCI Track Cycling World Cup Classics
2008 in Danish sport
UCI Track Cycling World Cup – Women's individual pursuit